The School Standards and Framework Act 1998 was the major education legislation passed by the incoming Labour government led by Tony Blair.
This Act:
 imposed a limit of 30 on infant class sizes.
 abolished grant-maintained schools, introducing foundation status.
 provided for a schedule of fully selective state schools (grammar schools), and set up a procedure by which local communities could vote for their abolition. No grammar schools have yet been abolished using this mechanism.
 prohibited the expansion of partial selection but allowed some specialist schools to admit 10% of pupils based on aptitude in their subject specialisms.
 introduced super headteachers and Education Action Zones
 introduced an Admissions Code and the office of Schools Adjudicator to enforce this Code and consider objections to admission arrangements.
introduced a right of appeal against the refusal of an admission authority to offer an applicant child a place at the relevant school.
 expanded on the requirement that "each pupil in attendance at a community, foundation or voluntary school shall on each school day take part in an act of collective worship" of a “wholly or mainly of a broadly Christian character” for community schools.
 created the local School Organisation Committee to decide school organisation proposals (opening, merging, closing) and responsible for approving the local School Organisation Plan. The School Organisation Committee consisted of five voting groups:
LEA, made up of elected members
Church of England
Catholic Church
Learning and Skills Council (often only vote on decisions affecting 16+ education)
schools, by serving governors.
 banned corporal punishment in all schools.

See also

 Education Reform Act 1988
 Education Act 1944

References

Further reading
 Trowler, P, 1998, Education Policy: a Policy Sociology Approach, Gildridge Press, Eastbourne. .

United Kingdom Acts of Parliament 1998
United Kingdom Education Acts
Education in England
Education in Wales
1998 in education